Woodlawn Estates is an upscale neighborhood located in Columbus, Georgia. In recent years, the neighborhood has had a real estate boom, with many houses built, most in the $250,000-$400,000 range.

References

Columbus metropolitan area, Georgia
Neighborhoods in Columbus, Georgia